Ehman is a German surname. Notable people with the surname include:

 Gerry Ehman, (1932 – 2006), Canadian ice hockey player and scout
 Jerry R. Ehman, American astronomer best known for his work at SETI
 Jakob Ehman, Canadian actor best known for his role as Miles in the film adaptation of The Drawer Boy.

See also
Ehmann

German-language surnames